Tribulus is a genus of plants in the family Zygophyllaceae and found in diverse climates and soils worldwide from latitudes 35°S to 47°N. The best-known member is T. terrestris (puncture vine), a widespread invasive species and weed.

Tribulus species are perennial, but some grow as annuals in colder climates.  The leaves are opposite and compound. The flowers are perfect (hermaphroditic) and insect-pollinated, with fivefold symmetry.  The ovary is divided into locules that are in turn divided by "false septa" (the latter distinguish Tribulus from other members of its family).

Some species are cultivated as ornamental plants in warm regions. Some, notably T. cistoides, T. longipetalus, T. terrestris, and T. zeyheri, are considered weeds. Tribulus omanense is the national flower of Dubai. Thirteen species of Tribulus are accepted by The Plant List, but there are many names still unresolved and needing further study.

List of accepted species

(According to Plants of the world online)
Tribulus adelacanthus R.M.Barker
Tribulus arabicus Hosni
Tribulus astrocarpus F.Muell.
Tribulus bimucronatus Viv.
Tribulus cistoides L.
Tribulus cristatus C.Presl
Tribulus echinops Kers
Tribulus eichlerianus K.L.Wilson
Tribulus excrucians Wawra
Tribulus forrestii F.Muell.
Tribulus hirsutus Benth.
Tribulus hystrix R.Br.
Tribulus incanus Hosni
Tribulus kaiseri Hosni
Tribulus macrocarpus F.Muell. ex Benth.
Tribulus macropterus Boiss.
Tribulus megistopterus Kralik
Tribulus micrococcus Domin
Tribulus minutus Leichh. ex Benth.
Tribulus mollis Ehrenb. ex Schweinf.
Tribulus occidentalis R.Br.
Tribulus omanense Hosni
Tribulus parvispinus C.Presl
Tribulus pentandrus Forssk.
Tribulus platypterus Benth.
Tribulus ranunculiflorus F.Muell.
Tribulus securidocarpus Engl.
Tribulus spurius Kralik
Tribulus suberosus H.Eichler ex R.M.Barker
Tribulus subramanyamii P.Singh, G.S.Giri & V.Singh
Tribulus terrestris L.
Tribulus zeyheri Sond.

Uses
T. terrestris has been cultivated to inhibit soil erosion and to improve soil moisture, texture, and water-holding capability in deserts and barren lands. Although T. terrestris extracts have been used in traditional medicine and as a dietary supplement for bodybuilders, there is no high-quality clinical evidence that it is effective or safe for these purposes.

References

External links

 Tribulus in BoDD – Botanical Dermatology Database
 Technical description of Zygophyllaceae from The Families of Flowering Plants, L. Watson and M. J. Dallwitz

 
Rosid genera
Taxa named by Carl Linnaeus
Plants described in 1753